For other hotels named Exchange Hotel, see Exchange Hotel.

The Exchange Hotel is a historic landmark hotel in Kalgoorlie, Western Australia.

Location
The hotel is located on the corner of Hannan Street and Maritana Street in Kalgoorlie. It stands next door to the building of the Kalgoorlie Miner, the goldfields newspaper, and opposite the Palace Hotel.

History

The hotel was built in 1900 for the Wilkie Brothers, contractors for the Southern Cross-Kalgoorlie railway line. They hired the construction team Shaw and Harcorn, and the architectural team Hawkins and Spriggs. It has two storeys and it made up of bricks, iron and a timber balustrade. It has a corner tower and corrugated galvanised iron gabled roof.

During the race riots of 1934, the hotel was purchased by Bill Trythall from the former owner, who had a foreign-sounding name. As a result, the building was saved from damage.

In 2011, it went into receivership as a result of declining clientele. In January 2013, it was purchased by a new owner. Their use of "skimpies", i.e. topless waitresses, is good for tourism.

Heritage value
The hotel has been listed on the State Heritage Register since 1997.

References

1900 establishments in Australia
Hotel buildings completed in 1900
Hotels established in 1900
Heritage places in Kalgoorlie, Western Australia
Pubs in Western Australia
Hotels in Kalgoorlie-Boulder
Hannan Street, Kalgoorlie
State Register of Heritage Places in the City of Kalgoorlie-Boulder